"Jenny from the Block" is a song by American singer Jennifer Lopez, which features American rappers Jadakiss and Styles P, both members of The LOX. It was released by Epic Records on September 26, 2002, as the lead single from her third studio album, This Is Me... Then (2002). The song, first leaked online, was written by Lopez, Troy Oliver, Mr. Deyo, Samuel Barnes, and Jean Claude Olivier. Cory Rooney, Olivier, Barnes, and Oliver produced the song. Another version of the track features solely Lopez, which was part of the Brazilian edition of the album.

"Jenny from the Block" is a R&B and old school hip hop song, which lyrically is about Lopez’s desire, despite her level of fame and fortune, to remain humble and true to her roots in The Bronx. The song was noted by critics for using a large amount of musical samples from songs such as 20th Century Steel Band's song "Heaven and Hell Is on Earth" (1975) and Boogie Down Productions' "South Bronx" (1987), and "Hi-Jack" by Enoch Light.

While some critics praised the song and theme, others disregarded the lyrics as "silly" and "laughable". Despite this, the song became a commercial success, topping the charts in Canada, reaching number three on the US Billboard Hot 100 and charting within the top ten of several major music markets. The song's music video also caused controversy. It featured Lopez and her boyfriend at the time, Ben Affleck, who later credited the video with nearly "ruining his career", in several raunchy scenes through the paparazzi's point of view. The song has been referenced in popular culture and since its release, Lopez has been referred to as "Jenny from the Block" in the media.

Background and release 
This Is Me... Then was released in November 2002. However, "Jenny from the Block" featuring rappers Jadakiss and Styles P of The LOX was leaked by a pop station in Hartford, Connecticut, and later distributed to other stations owned by Infinity Broadcasting. In response, Lopez and Epic Records pushed forward the album's release date to September 26, the same day "Jenny from the Block" was officially sent to US radio. Unlike her previous studio albums: On the 6 (1999) and J.Lo (2001), Lopez had a more "hands-on" role on This Is Me... Then. The album also had more of an adult-R&B sound. Musically, majority of the songs on This Is Me... Then were lyrically "dedicated" to her relationship with then-fiancé, actor Ben Affleck. The Age newspaper said the album was a "declaration" of love for Affleck. During an interview, Lopez said "I wrote a lot of songs inspired, in a way, by what I was going through at the time that this album was being made, and he [Affleck] was definitely a big part of that." Several critics highlighted that the album showed how "smitten" she was, and that the content was borderline "annoying".

During the production of the album, Affleck and Lopez were a prominent super couple in the media, and were dubbed "Bennifer". Lopez stated "We try to make the best of it  I'm not saying there's not times that we wish [we] could just be going to the movies and come out and there's not a crowd there waiting. You just want to spend your Sunday afternoon not working, but at the same time we both love what we do. If that's something that's part of it, then that's fine. We feel the love and we're very happy about it." The overexposure from the media and public interest in their relationship resulted in less admiration for their work and negatively affected their careers, in particular affecting the video for "Jenny from the Block".

Production and lyrics

"Jenny from the Block" is an uptempo R&B and old school hip hop song. It was produced by Troy Oliver, written by Andre Deyo, remixed by Samuel Barnes, Jean-Claude Olivier, and contained samples by Enoch Light, Lawrence Parker, Scott Sterling and Michael Oliver. Trackmasters produced the song alongside Oliver and Cory Rooney. The song "intones her modest childhood roots", with Lopez singing in the chorus: "Don't be fooled by the rocks that I got / I'm still, I'm still Jenny from the Block / Used to have a little now I have a lot / No matter where I go, I know where I came from". She implores the listener not to be fooled by the types of rocks that she now possesses, because she is still Jennifer from the same block. She now owns many rocks and despite this, she still knows where she comes from. At the start of her career, J.Lo's first big break was as a backup dancer for New Kids on the Block.

"Jenny from the Block" samples a number of songs. The opening line of the track, "Children grow and women producing, men go working, some go stealing, everyone's got to make a living", is derived from 20th Century Steel Band's 1975 song "Heaven and Hell Is on Earth". The constant flute loop through the song is an interpolation of Enoch Light's "Hi-Jack" (1975), while the bridge samples Boogie Down Productions' "South Bronx" (1987). Trackmasters allegedly incorporated the sample of The Beatnuts' song "Watch Out Now" from their album A Musical Massacre (1999), which also sampled "Hi-Jack", on the track. Believing Lopez and the song's producers had stolen their sample of "Hi-Jack" without consent, they subsequently insulted Lopez on the song "Confused Rappers", from their album Milk Me (2004). The group said: "Anybody familiar with our music who heard Jenny From The Block knew it was a Beatnuts beat. There’s no getting around it. That’s a straight-up bite. It’s the same drums, the same flute, the same tempo... everything is our idea. If we never flipped that sample, there would be no Jenny From The Block."

Critical response
"Jenny from the Block" generated a polarized reception among music critics and pop music fans, with some applauding it as a "strong self statement" and homage to Lopez's roots, and others dismissing it as "silly". Sal Cinquemani of Slant Magazine called the song "infectious", but noted that it is "more like a disease than a chunky casserole". Tom Sinclair of Entertainment Weekly was favorable, writing: "Lopez insists that fame hasn't changed her, and seduced by the breezy pleasure of her new music, we're almost inclined to believe her". Arion Berger of Rolling Stone opined that the song "is worth listening to — its windup/wind-down chorus is as sly and curvy as Lopez". On a list of "17 of the Best Songs About NYC", Time magazine placed "Jenny from the Block" at number twelve. Complex magazine praised the inclusion of the "South Bronx" sample, writing: "After becoming a full-blown superstar whose entire life was different in every way, J. Lo was still trying to convince us she was "real" and still the same old girl from the block. What better way to connect to her roots musically than to put on for her hometown with the greatest Bronx anthem ever put to wax, BDP's "South Bronx"?"

Allmusic's Stephen Thomas Erlewine gave the song an unfavorable review, calling  it "silly" and describing the lyrics as "laughable". James Poletti of Yahoo! Music was also negative, calling it "agonizing" and a "cynical appropriation of hip-hop culture". Writing for The Village Voice, Jon Caramanica was highly unfavorable of "Jenny from the Block", stating that "Jenny aims to fast-talk herself into authenticity". AOL Radio deemed it one of the "100 Worst Songs Ever" in 2010, remarking: "Yup, just your average girl, willing to risk a national TV gig over the size of her 'dressing-room compound.'" In a countdown of "50 Most Awesomely Bad Songs ... Ever", VH1 and Blender ranked "Jenny from the Block" at number thirty-three. Her Campus included the song on a list of "15 Songs We're Embarrassed to Still Know All the Lyrics To". In a television special titled The 100 Most Annoying Pop Songs...We Hate To Love, BBC ranked "Jenny from the Block" at number one-hundred. On a similar special for Channel 4 titled The 100 Worst Pop Records, the song was named the tenth worst song ever. Amy Sciarretto of PopCrush observed in 2012: "'Jenny From the Block' is quite a polarizing track ... Either you love the 'J. Lo' tune because it's boastful and oozes confidence or you hate it because it's cheesy and makes use of flutes."

Chart performance
On the US Billboard Hot 100, "Jenny from the Block" debuted at number 67 for the week of October 12, 2002. By its third week on the Hot 100, the song had propelled to the top twenty, reaching number 17. For the Billboard issue dated November 23, 2002, it entered the top ten of the Hot 100, jumping to number eight. It also reached the top ten of the Hot 100 Airplay chart, at number nine. The following week, the song continued climbing the Hot 100, moving to number six, while also reaching the top five of the Hot 100 Airplay chart.

By December 14, it peaked at three on the Hot 100, where it remained for three weeks, and also jumped to three on the Airplay chart. Three weeks later, on December 28, "Jenny from the Block" remained stalling at three on the Hot 100 and the Airplay chart. For three weeks it had been blocked from the top spot of both charts by Eminem's "Lose Yourself" and Missy Elliott's "Work It". It peaked at two on the US Mainstream Top 40 Pop Songs and 22 on the US Hot R&B/Hip-Hop Songs chart.

In Australia, "Jenny from the Block" made its debut inside the top ten at number eight on December 1, 2002. On January 5, 2003, it moved to its peak of five, where it remained for two weeks, and spent a total of sixteen weeks on the chart. The song peaked atop the Billboard Canadian Hot 100, becoming her third number-one there following "If You Had My Love" (1999) and "Love Don't Cost a Thing" (2001). In Italy, it debuted at its peak of number four on December 21, and remained on the chart for sixteen weeks, all of which it remained in the top ten for; exiting on March 6, 2003. In New Zealand, it debuted at 49 on November 11, 2002; it peaked at number six on December 8 and spent a total of sixteen weeks on the chart. It was certified Gold by RIANZ for sales of 7,500 copies. It peaked at number two in Spain on December 24, 2002.

In the United Kingdom it peaked at number three on the UK Singles Chart, becoming her ninth top-ten hit in Britain, as well as her fourth song to peak at three. In April 2020, the song was certified gold for shipments of over 400,000 copies in the country, her third after If You Had My Love and Get Right.

In Norway, the song debuted at number six and peaked at five. It has been certified Platinum there for sales of 10,000 copies.

Music video

The song's accompanying music video was directed by Francis Lawrence. Its theme revolves around the media invading Lopez's life, particularly her relationship with then-boyfriend, Ben Affleck. The video was filmed entirely in Los Angeles, CA from October 18–20, 2002. It premiered on MTV's TRL on November 5, 2002, and on BET's 106 & Park on December 9, 2002.

The video begins with surveillance camera footage of Lopez and Affleck in their apartment. Lopez is then shown dancing in the apartment to music on her Mp3 player, which is captured by the paparazzi. She is also seen performing the song (clothed in different outfits) amid bright lights on the streets of New York City with Jadakiss and Styles P. Separate scenes depict Lopez and Affleck on a yacht, sun tanning, and swimming in the ocean. Footage of the couple having lunch at a restaurant and stopping at a gas station is also captured by the paparazzi. Lopez later visits a jewelry store, and sings "Loving You" in a recording studio. Finally, the couple are shown spending time together by a pool.

Speaking of the video, Melissa Ng of The Spectator wrote: "Before celebrities become stars, they dream about gaining fame, fortune, and being in the spotlight [sic] Jennifer Lopez released a video for her single, Jenny From the Block. The video is basically about how she cannot find privacy with her fiancé Ben Affleck. A lot of glamour is associated with fame and fortune; however, along with that glamour comes the loss of privacy." Justine Ashley Costanza of International Business Times wrote in 2012: "Back when Lopez was engaged to the wholesome actor, she decided it would be best to make a video about how hard their lives were. Poor J-Lo couldn't lounge on her yacht, be adored in a hot tub, or wear her $1 million engagement ring without someone taking her picture. It's not easy being overly wealthy superstars. The video's premise shows Lopez dealing with the perils of fame the only way she knows how ... by taking off most of what she's wearing."

Live performances
"Jenny from the Block" was performed at the 2018 MTV Video Music Awards on August 20, 2018. The song was performed by Lopez during the Super Bowl LIV halftime show.

Impact
"Jenny from the Block" is considered one of Lopez's signature songs and most iconic single. The lyrical content of country artist Faith Hill's 2005 song "Mississippi Girl" was considered to be influenced by the song, with Rolling Stone describing it as "country music's version" of the single; Billboard called it "a countrified 'Jenny from the Block'". Other songs that were noted to have followed the theme of "Jenny from the Block" were Gwen Stefani's "Orange County Girl" and Fergie's "Glamorous".

Mexican-American recording artist Becky G recorded a cover version of the song, entitled "Becky from the Block". The song's accompanying music video was shot in Inglewood, California. Lopez made a cameo appearance towards the end of the music video. The lyrics of this version are significantly different from the original. Entertainment Tonight described the version to have "give[n] Jenny's NY-based tune a West Coast slant". Australian rapper Iggy Azalea referenced the song in her verse from Lopez's 2014 song "Booty", stating: "The last time the world seen a booty this good, it was on Jenny from the block." In her 2018 single, "Dinero" featuring DJ Khaled, American rapper Cardi B ends her verse by referencing rapper's and Lopez's beginnings: "Two bad bitches that came from the Bronx, Cardi from the pole and Jenny from the block". Rapper Drake, who Lopez was believed to have been romantically involved with in the past, references her and the song in his 2018 single "In My Feelings", stating: "From the block like you Jenny/ I know you special, girl, 'cause I know too many."

Ben Affleck's appearance in the song's music video became notorious, having been released at the peak of the couple's "frenzied" tabloid coverage. Paper magazine wrote: "Love makes people do crazy things, and that's our only explanation for this." Their relationship received widespread media coverage. They became engaged in November 2002, but their planned wedding on September 14, 2003, was postponed with four days' notice because of "excessive media attention". They broke up in January 2004. Lopez later described the split as her "first real heartbreak" and attributed it in part to Affleck's discomfort with the media scrutiny. During an interview in 2008, Affleck stated that he nearly "ruined" his career by starring in the clip, "If I have a big regret, it was doing the music video. But that happened years ago. I've moved on." He also stated: "It not only makes me look like a petulant fool (to blame Lopez), but it surely qualifies as ungentlemanly? For the record, did she hurt my career? No." In response, Latina magazine wrote: "Riiiigght. So it wasn't a string of bad movies starting with Reindeer Games in 2000 and a general lack of on-screen appeal that ruined your career, right Ben? It was a music video. What else can we blame on a music video? Global warming?" Following Lopez's marriage to Marc Anthony, she reportedly attempted to have the music video blocked from television networks such as VH1 and MTV.

In the past decade since the song's release, Lopez has been nicknamed "Jenny from The Block" in the media, a name news reporters and journalists often use. At the 68th Golden Globe Awards in 2011, comedian Ricky Gervais referenced the song: "She's just Jenny from the block. If the block in question is that one on Rodeo Drive between Cartier and Prada." In October 2015, a video clip filmed in Afghanistan years ago surfaced online of two US Marines singing "Jenny from the Block" moments before being fired at by the Taliban.

Track listings

Charts

Weekly charts

Year-end charts

Certifications

Release history

Cover versions

Becky G ("Becky from the Block")

American singer Becky G released a cover version of the song with rewritten lyrics, titled "Becky from the Block" with Gomez rapping about her life before fame and what she wants to accomplish. Lopez appeared in Gomez's music video for the song. The song is Gomez's official debut single following three collaborations in 2012, including "Problem" featuring Will.i.am

Track listing

References

External links

2002 singles
American hip hop songs
Canadian Singles Chart number-one singles
Number-one singles in Hungary
Number-one singles in Poland
Jadakiss songs
Jennifer Lopez songs
Music videos directed by Francis Lawrence
Sampling controversies
Songs written by Jennifer Lopez
Songs written by Troy Oliver
Songs written by Andre Deyo
Styles P songs
Songs written by Fernando Arbex
Songs written by Samuel Barnes (songwriter)
Song recordings produced by Cory Rooney
2002 songs
Songs written by Jean-Claude Olivier
Songs about musicians
Cultural depictions of musicians